Maana Ka Gharana is a Pakistani television series of Hum TV that was first aired on 9 December 2015. It is written by Aliya Bukhari and directed by Shahzad Kashmiri and produced by Momina Duraid under MD Productions.

Plot 
Maana Ka Gharana actually includes Maana (Sana Javed)'s father Ghalib who is known to be the brother of Malik (Shamil Khan) and maternal uncle of Khizer (Shehroz Sabzwari). Khizer likes Maana but Maana sees Khizer as a friend only. Maana wanted to marry a rich man who could show her the world. Maana doesn't like her village and wants to see the city of lights. Maana happily married Gul-Bahar (Malik's wife)'s nephew Shahryar (a rich businessman). Khizer never told Maana about his feelings for her. He pretends to be happy that Maana is marrying Shahryar. And Saleha (Raheela Agha) Zaari's sister and Maana's mother also wanted Maana to marry Shahryar. She thinks that Khizer deserves a much better girl than Maana because Maana is more like a child and Khizer behaves more maturely. Maana's fiancé Shehryar does not like Maana's friendship with Khizer. Shehryar start thinking about the plan by which he can broke the good image of Khizer in everyone eye's. He succeeded in making a plan he blame Khizer for stealing the precious diamond ring which he had brought for Maana. Everyone was shocked when the ring was founded from Khizer's room. Saleha asked Khizer to leave the house. Khizer told them of his innocence but no one believes in him. He left the house it was rainy night. In image, Maana found Shahryar with a woman. She asked this from servant, he said, she was Saman (Sarah Khan). She said, where is she now? He said that she died after their divorce.

Cast    
 Shehroz Sabzwari as Khizer
 Sana Javed as Maana 
 Daniyal Raheel as Shehriyar
 Humayun Gul
 Shamil Khan as Maalik 
 Erum Akhtar as Zari
 Zuhab Khan as Happy
 Humayun Fazal Chaudhry as Ghalib
 Raheela Agha as Saleha
 Ayesha Toor as Gul Bahar
 Sarah Khan as Saman

Production
The series was earlier titled Ishq Bacha Hai. The production location of the serial was Azad Kashmir.

References 

Dramas Online

External links 
 Maana Ka Gharana Episode 1 9 December 2015

2015 Pakistani television series debuts
2016 Pakistani television series endings
Pakistani telenovelas
Urdu-language television shows
Hum TV original programming